The 2024 United States House of Representatives elections in Colorado will be held on November 5, 2024, to elect the nine U.S. representatives from the State of Colorado, one from each of the state's congressional districts. The elections will coincide with the 2024 U.S. presidential election, as well as other elections to the House of Representatives, elections to the United States Senate, and various state and local elections.

District 3

The 3rd district encompasses the Colorado Western Slope, including the cities of Montrose, Pueblo, and Grand Junction. The incumbent is Republican Lauren Boebert, who was re-elected with 50.1% of the vote in 2022.

Republican primary

Candidates

Publicly expressed interest
Cleave Simpson, state senator for the 6th district

Potential
Lauren Boebert, incumbent U.S. Representative

Democratic primary

Candidates

Declared
Debby Burnett, veterinarian
 Adam Frisch, former Aspen city councilor and nominee for this district in 2022

General election

Predictions

District 8

The 8th district includes the northern Front Range cities and surrounding Denver communities, including Thornton, Brighton, Johnstown, and Greeley. The incumbent is Democrat Yadira Caraveo, who was elected with 48.4% of the vote in 2022.

Democratic primary

Candidates

Potential
Yadira Caraveo, incumbent U.S. Representative

Republican primary

Candidates

Potential
Barbara Kirkmeyer, state senator for the 23rd district and nominee for this district in 2022

General election

Predictions

References

2024
Colorado
United States House of Representatives